Ghadir Kuhi (also Romanized as Ghadīr Kūhī) is a village in Bandar Charak Rural District, Shibkaveh District, Bandar Lengeh County, Hormozgan Province, Iran. At the 2006 census, its population was 213, in 39 families.

References 

Populated places in Bandar Lengeh County